Hammond Peek is a New Zealand sound engineer. He has won two Academy Awards for Best Sound and has been nominated for another two in the same category. Of Māori descent, Peek affiliates to Ngāi Tahu and Te Āti Awa.

Selected filmography
Peek has won two Academy Awards and has been nominated for another two:

Won
 The Lord of the Rings: The Return of the King (2003)
 King Kong (2005)

Nominated
 The Lord of the Rings: The Fellowship of the Ring (2001)
 The Lord of the Rings: The Two Towers (2002)

References

External links

Year of birth missing (living people)
Living people
New Zealand audio engineers
Best Sound Mixing Academy Award winners
Ngāi Tahu people
Te Āti Awa people